The 1972 Washington Redskins season  was the 41st in the National Football League (NFL) and the 36th in Washington, D.C. The Redskins were trying to build on the success of the previous season, in which they had finished 9-4-1 and made the postseason for the first time in 26 seasons. They ultimately finished the year 11-3 (the best record in the Allen era).

Head coach George Allen, in just his second season with the team, took the Redskins to their first Super Bowl. The team, who had missed the postseason in the entirety of the 1950s and 1960s, won its first postseason game since 1943, and appeared in its first league championship game since 1945.

The NFC champion Redskins would ultimately lose a very close Super Bowl VII, 14–7, to the undefeated Miami Dolphins.

The 1972 season was the first in which the team wore its former logo, which featured a Native American head in profile within a gold circle. The logo would stay with the team for the next 48 seasons until both it and the team nickname were reitred after the 2019 season. With the Washington Senators relocating to Texas in 1971, the Baltimore Bullets not relocating until the summer of 1973, and the Washington Capitals having their inaugural season in 1974, the 1972 Redskins were at the time the D.C. area's only team playing in one of the major professional sports leagues in the United States and Canada.

Offseason

NFL Draft

Roster

Pre season

Schedule

Pre Season Game Officials

Pre season Game summaries

Week P1 (Friday, August 4, 1972): vs. Baltimore Colts

 Time of Game:

Week P2 (Friday, August 11, 1972): vs. Denver Broncos

 Time of Game: 2 hours, 45 minutes

Week P3 (Friday, August 18, 1972): vs. Philadelphia Eagles

 Time of Game:

Week P4 (Friday, August 25, 1972): at Detroit Lions

 Time of Game:

Week P5 (Thursday, August 31, 1972): vs. Miami Dolphins

 Time of Game: 2 hours, 27 minutes

Week P6 (Saturday, September 9, 1972): at Pittsburgh Steelers

 Time of Game:

Regular season

Schedule

Regular Season Game Officials

Standings

Regular Season Game summaries

Week 1 (Monday, September 18, 1972): at Minnesota Vikings

 Time of Game:

Week 2 (Sunday, September 24, 1972): vs. St. Louis Cardinals

 Time of Game:

Week 3 (Sunday, October 1, 1972): at New England Patriots

 Time of Game: 2 hours, 34 minutes

Week 4 (Sunday, October 8, 1972): vs. Philadelphia Eagles

 Time of Game:

Week 5 (Sunday, October 15, 1972): at St. Louis Cardinals

 Time of Game:

Week 6 (Sunday, October 22, 1972): vs. Dallas Cowboys

 Time of Game:

Week 7 (Sunday, October 29, 1972): at New York Giants

 Time of Game:

Week 8 (Sunday, November 5, 1972): at New York Jets

 Time of Game:

Week 9 (Sunday, November 12, 1972): vs. New York Giants

 Time of Game:

Week 10 (Monday, November 20, 1972): vs. Atlanta Falcons

 Time of Game:

Week 11 (Sunday, November 26, 1972): vs. Green Bay Packers

 Time of Game:

Week 12 (Sunday, December 3, 1972): at Philadelphia Eagles

 Time of Game:

Week 13 (Saturday, December 9, 1972): at Dallas Cowboys

 Time of Game:

Week 14 (Sunday, December 17, 1972): vs. Buffalo Bills

 Time of Game:

Stats

Passing

Rushing

Receiving

Kicking

Punting

Kick Return

Punt Return

Sacks

Interceptions

Fumbles

Tackles

Scoring Summary

Team

Quarter-by-quarter

Postseason

Playoffs

Playoff Game Officials

Playoff Game summaries

NFC Divisional Playoffs (Sunday, December 24, 1972): vs. Green Bay Packers

Point spread: Redskins –5
 Time of Game:

NFC Championship Game (Sunday, December 31, 1972): vs. Dallas Cowboys

Point spread: Redskins –3
 Time of Game:

Super Bowl VII (Sunday, January 14, 1973): vs. Miami Dolphins

Point spread: Redskins –3
 Over/Under: 33.0 (under)
 Time of Game: 2 hours, 40 minutes

Awards and records
 Larry Brown, NFL MVP
 Larry Brown, Bert Bell Award
 Larry Brown, AP NFL Offensive Player of the Year
 Billy Kilmer, NFL leader (tied) in touchdown passes (19).  NFL leader in passer rating (84.8).

Milestones

References

Washington
NFC East championship seasons
National Football Conference championship seasons
Washington Redskins seasons
Washing